The buffy-tufted marmoset (Callithrix aurita), also known as the buffy tufted-ear marmoset or white-eared marmoset, is a New World monkey that lives in the forests on the Atlantic coast of southeast Brazil. Of all the marmosets, it has the southernmost range.

The buffy-tufted marmoset resembles the common marmoset, but is somewhat larger. It has grey-black skin, and the most obvious differences from the common marmoset are its whitish face ("skull-like facial mask",) brown crown, and shorter ear tufts.

The buffy-tufted marmoset lives in coastal forests from sea level up to 500 m. It is diurnal and arboreal, living almost all its life in the trees. It lives in small groups of two to eight animals.
Unlike most other marmosets, the buffy-tufted marmoset almost exclusively eats insects. It does not eat tree sap, which may be related to having a very small snout. Aside from the insects, the buffy-tufted marmoset consumes also consumes varying types of flowering plants, such as Combretaceae and legumes, as well as gum, soursops, and cacti.

Little is known about the buffy-tufted marmoset reproductive patterns. Gestation is about 170 days, and births are typically of fraternal twin offspring.

References

buffy-tufted marmoset
Mammals of Brazil
Endemic fauna of Brazil
Fauna of the Atlantic Forest
Environment of Rio de Janeiro (state)
Environment of São Paulo (state)
Vulnerable animals
Vulnerable biota of South America
buffy-tufted marmoset
Taxa named by Étienne Geoffroy Saint-Hilaire